Walter F. Rogosheske (July 12, 1914 – May 15, 1998) was an American jurist and politician.

Born in Sauk Rapids, Minnesota, Rogosheske attended Sauk Rapids High School, St. Cloud State University, and Valparaiso University. He received his bachelor's degree from University of Minnesota in 1937 and his law degree from University of Minnesota Law School. Rogesheske served in the United States Army during World War II. He served in the Minnesota House of Representatives from 1943 to 1949 as a Republican. Rogosheske moved to Little Falls, Minnesota, in 1950, when he was appointed a Minnesota District Court judge. He served on the Minnesota Supreme Court from 1962 to 1980.

Notes

1914 births
1998 deaths
People from Little Falls, Minnesota
People from Sauk Rapids, Minnesota
Military personnel from Minnesota
Valparaiso University alumni
St. Cloud State University alumni
University of Minnesota Law School alumni
Minnesota state court judges
Justices of the Minnesota Supreme Court
Republican Party members of the Minnesota House of Representatives
20th-century American judges
20th-century American politicians